Sherburn House railway station served the hamlet of Sherburn House and the village of Sherburn, County Durham in England from 1837 to 1931 on the Durham to Sunderland Line.

History 
The first station opened was as Sherburn in 1837 by the Durham & Sunderland Railway. It served as the temporary terminus of their line from Sunderland Town Moor until the line reached its intended terminus at Shincliffe Town station in Shincliffe on 28 June 1839. The station was renamed Sherburn House on 1 April to avoid confusion with another Sherburn station which was renamed  on the same day.

At the same time as the opening of the line to Durham Elvet, the original station at Sherburn House was replaced by a new station on the Elvet branch. The second station was situated on the west side of the A181. The passenger service to Elvet was unsuccessful, thus regular passenger services were withdrawn on 1 January 1931. The station was still used for one day a year (except the war years) until 11 January 1954, when the station closed to all traffic.

References

External links 

Disused railway stations in North Yorkshire
Former North Eastern Railway (UK) stations
Railway stations in Great Britain opened in 1893
Railway stations in Great Britain closed in 1931
1893 establishments in England
1954 disestablishments in England